Liu Shuhua (born 23 October 1962) is a former professional tennis player from China.

Biography
Debuting for the China Davis Cup team in 1983, Shuhua went on to feature in a total of 15 ties, for a 19/12 win-loss record.

Shuhua won multiple Asian Games medals for China, including bronze medals at the singles events in 1982 and 1986, as well as three medals in doubles.

At the 1988 Summer Olympics in Barcelona he was a member of the Chinese team, partnering Ma Keqin in the men's doubles. They lost in the first round to the eventual bronze medal winning Czechoslovak pairing of Miloslav Mečíř and Milan Šrejber.

References

External links
 
 
 

1962 births
Living people
Chinese male tennis players
Tennis players at the 1988 Summer Olympics
Olympic tennis players of China
Tennis players at the 1982 Asian Games
Tennis players at the 1986 Asian Games
Tennis players at the 1990 Asian Games
Medalists at the 1982 Asian Games
Medalists at the 1986 Asian Games
Medalists at the 1990 Asian Games
Asian Games silver medalists for China
Asian Games bronze medalists for China
Asian Games medalists in tennis
20th-century Chinese people